A kingmaker is a person or group that has great influence on a royal or political succession, without themselves being a viable candidate. Kingmakers may use political, monetary, religious, and military means to influence the succession. Originally, the term applied to the activities of Richard Neville, 16th Earl of Warwick—"Warwick the Kingmaker"—during the Wars of the Roses (1455–1487) in England.

Examples 

 The prophet Samuel of the Hebrew Bible, in the transition from the period of the biblical judges to the institution of a Kingdom of Israel under Saul, and again in the transition from Saul to David
 Chanakya in the Maurya Empire
 The Praetorian Guard in the Roman Empire
 Yeon Gaesomun in Goguryeo
 Tonyukuk in the Second Turkic Khaganate
 Sayyid brothers in the Mughal Empire
 Vidyaranya in the Vijayanagara Empire
 Ricimer in the Late Western Roman Empire – magister militum who appointed a series of puppet emperors
 Nogai, Mamai, and Edigu in the Golden Horde
 Janissaries, Midhat Pasha in the Ottoman Empire
 Godwin, Earl of Wessex in late Anglo-Saxon England
 Baron Carl Otto Mörner in the House of Bernadotte (King of Sweden)
 Henry of Blois, Bishop of Winchester during The Anarchy
 Wiremu Tamihana in the Māori King Movement
 Hato Hasbún in El Salvador
 Richard Neville, 16th Earl of Warwick – wealthiest peer in England during the Wars of the Roses, who overthrew King Henry VI and then restored him over his successor King Edward IV
 Hajji Ebrahim Shirazi – the kalantar (lord mayor) of Shiraz and later the grand vizier of Qajar Iran who enthroned four kings from two different dynasties: Jafar Khan, Lotf Ali Khan, Agha Mohammad Khan and Fath-Ali Shah.
 Mohandas Karamchand Gandhi – a pre-eminent political and ideological leader of India during the Indian independence movement under whose influence were all the major political leaders of the Indian freedom struggle including Jawaharlal Nehru and Vallabbhai Patel
 James Farley – orchestrated the gubernatorial and presidential elections of Franklin D. Roosevelt (1928–1940)
 Che Guevara – accompanied Fidel Castro in the Revolution and later helped him attain power
 K. Kamaraj – instrumental in making Lal Bahadur Shastri and Indira Gandhi as Prime Ministers of India in 1964 and 1966, respectively
 G. K. Moopanar – The 'kingmaker' who rose to prominence in the Indian national scene during the post-Emergency days of Prime Minister Indira Gandhi. He was the General Secretary in charge of the Congress Working Committee, a body of High Command in the ruling Indian National Congress government. Moopanar, who decided the fate of Indian National Congress chief ministers in the states of India, was more than any other responsible for the elevation of Rajiv Gandhi to the Premiership on the assassination of his mother, Indira Gandhi. He was the longest serving General Secretary of All India Congress Committee (1980 - 1988), and served with Indria Gandhi, Sanjay Gandhi and Rajiv Gandhi.
 Girija Prasad Koirala – described as a kingmaker in Nepal with the election of Madhav Kumar Nepal
 Fred Malek – described as a kingmaker for the Republican Party in the United States
 David Axelrod – former Chicago Tribune reporter described by U.S. News & World Report as a "reporter turned kingmaker" with respect to Barack Obama's 2008 presidential campaign.
Bakili Muluzi – described as a kingmaker in Malawi
 Muhammad Ali Jinnah – an influential politician who became an ideological leader of All-India Muslim League and the first Governor-General of Pakistan; widely regarded as the founder of Pakistan.
 Stefan Cardinal Wyszyński – Primate of Poland who was highly instrumental in the 1978 papal election of Karol Wojtyła, Archbishop of Kraków, as Pope John Paul II
 Abdul Rashid Dostum – Afghan Army Marshal, leader of the Afghan Uzbek community, and founder of Junbish-e Milli known for frequently backing the winning factions and political parties of Afghanistan's wars and elections.
 Rupert Murdoch – a media tycoon in ownership of News Corp and the Fox Corporation who has consistently backed every winning Prime Minister of the United Kingdom since the 1979 general election
 Sheldon G. Adelson – a Las Vegas gambling entrepreneur, had tremendous influence in the American and Israeli political spectrums and often made large donations especially to Donald Trump’s political campaigns and Administration  
 Nick Clegg – described as a kingmaker in the 2010 general election as the leader of the Liberal Democrats following a hung parliament
 Richard J. Daley as Mayor of Chicago and Chairman of the Cook County Democratic Party was the leading figure in the Illinois Democratic Party. As such, he controlled a large bloc of delegates at Democratic National Conventions and provided crucial support to the Democratic Party's presidential nominees, including Adlai Stevenson, John F. Kennedy, Lyndon Johnson, and Hubert Humphrey.
 Jarosław Kaczyński, Poland's kingmaker according to The Financial Times on February 2016.
 Democratic Unionist Party and its leader Arlene Foster became regarded as a kingmaker after the June 2017 general election resulted in a hung parliament in the Northern Ireland Assembly.
 Winston Peters and his party New Zealand First, New Zealand's kingmaker after both the 1996 and 2017 elections.
 Avigdor Lieberman and his party Yisrael Beiteinu in the September 2019 Israeli legislative election.
 Devlet Bahçeli and his party the Nationalist Movement Party, Turkey's kingmaker according to The Financial Times.
Albanian parties are said to be Northern Macedonia's kingmaker.
 Kurds in the Middle East.
 Turkey, Libya's kingmaker.
 Andrew Asiamah Amoako after the 2020 Ghanaian general election.
 Alliance 90/The Greens and Free Democratic Party after the 2021 German federal election.
 Asif Ali Zardari in the Pakistan after No-confidence motion against Imran Khan and selection of Chief Minister of Punjab (Pakistan) Hamza Shahbaz

In game theory 

In game theory, a kingmaker is a player who lacks sufficient resources or position to win at a given game, but possesses enough remaining resources to decide which of the remaining viable players will eventually win.

Contemporary usage 

The term "kingmaker", though always unofficial, has tended to gain more importance in places of power struggle—e.g., politics, sports organizations etc. Consequently, bestowal of such a title is looked upon significantly and more often as a means of indirect gratification for individuals wanting to silently dictate the affairs of the organization. The term is also occasionally used in a pejorative sense during elections where a small number of independent political candidate(s) who hold a sizeable sway in the "vote bank" can most likely decide the course of an outcome.

As well as referring to an individual, the term can also be applied to institutions or think tanks whose opinions are held in great regard by the interested organization. The influence of the religious orders like the Roman Catholic Church in running the affairs of the state during medieval times (through the king) is a well-known example. Kingdoms and empires in the Indian sub-continent often relied on their religious heads. Besides religious orders, even countries can fit into this terminology when they can dictate the affairs of the other country (either directly or indirectly). In current political scenarios across the world the term can expand its scope to include powerful lobbying groups, whose role is often seen as a defining factor on major issues.

Citizens of West African sub-national monarchies often use the word kingmaker to refer to the members of the electoral colleges that choose their sovereigns because they also usually officiate during the coronation rituals and rites of purification, the word in this particular case taking on a literal meaning i.e. a maker of the king.

The term "kingmaker" is also used to describe situations in multi-player games where a player is either unable to win or has claimed an unassailable lead, but, in either case, plays a strong role in determining the outcome for other players.

In fiction 

 The character Leon Fortunato from the Left Behind series of novels is often described as a kingmaker.
 Marcus Jefferson Wall, the antagonist of much of the Matador series by Steve Perry is called the Kingmaker, and controls the President of the Galactic Federation
 The character Mayvar Kingmaker from the Saga of the Exiles series of novels tests the ability of aspirants before they can be proclaimed king of the Tanu.
 Ser Criston Cole, a character from George R. R. Martin’s A Song of Ice and Fire series, is commonly referred to as "the kingmaker". In the story in which he appears The Dance of Dragons (The Blacks and the Greens,) the king dies while his eldest child and designated heir is absent from the castle, and Ser Criston, the head of the king's bodyguard, immediately plots with other like-minded individuals to crown the king's second child, because the king's younger child is male, whereas the heir is female. This triggers a nationwide civil war. The Dance of Dragons draws inspiration from both The Anarchy and The War of the Roses, events in British history that each contained kingmaker figures (Henry of Blois and Richard Neville, respectively.)
 Minato Yoko, a character from Kamen Rider Gaim, considers herself a kingmaker, wanting to see who has what it takes to take the Forbidden Fruit, a fruit of great power that can essentially make a person a king. Likewise, another character, Mitsuzane Kureshima, also has traits of a kingmaker, hanging around with and manipulating events so as to put the ruler in his favor.
 Harry Leong, the ultra-rich, secretive billionaire from Crazy Rich Asians, is revealed to be one of the kingmakers in the government of Singapore.
 One of the villains in the NBC TV series The Blacklist went under the alias The Kingmaker.
 Uhtred of Bebbanburg, from Bernard Cornwell's The Saxon Stories and the Netflix Adaptation The Last Kingdom, was considered a kingmaker during the succession of King Edward of Wessex after the death of Alfred the Great.

References 

Political terminology